Proliga can refer to different sports leagues:

Proliga (Indonesia), the Indonesian top-flight volleyball competition
Proliga (Portugal), the Portuguese second-tier basketball competition